Ethel Clayton (November 8, 1882 – June 6, 1966) was an American actress of the silent film era.

Early years
Born in Champaign, Illinois, Clayton attended St. Elizabeth's school in Chicago.

Career
Clayton debuted on stage as a professional as a member of the chorus in a production at the Chicago Opera House. After that, she worked with stock theater companies in Milwaukee and Minneapolis.

On stage, Clayton appeared mainly in musicals or musical revues such as The Ziegfeld Follies of 1911. In addition to that production, her Broadway credits include Fancy Free (1918), You're in Love (1917), Nobody Home (1915), The Red Canary (1914), The Brute (1912), and His Name on the Door (1909).

Clayton's first film was When the Earth Trembled. Following appearances on screen in short dramas from 1909 to 1912, she made her feature-length film debut in For the Love of a Girl in 1912. Barry O'Neil directed the film, and Clayton later was directed by William Demille, Robert G. Vignola, George Melford and Donald Crisp in subsequent feature films. Like many silent film actors, Clayton's career was hurt by the coming of sound to motion pictures. She continued her career in small parts in films until she retired in 1948.

Personal life
In 1931, Clayton obtained a California Superior Court order enjoining her former business partner, W.L. Rucker, from disposing of 316 pearls. Clayton and Rucker agreed to purchase a cosmetics business and the pearls had been entrusted to Rucker to raise money. The deal fell through and he refused to return the jewels. Rucker admitted to possessing the pearls but claimed they had been pledged as security for a $125 loan. The pearls were valued at $20,000.

Marriages
Clayton was first married to actor-director Joseph Kaufman until his death in 1918 in the Spanish flu epidemic. She later married silent film actor and former star Ian Keith twice and they divorced twice. In both cases Clayton cited cruelty and excessive drinking. Clayton and Keith were first married in Minneapolis in 1928 and first separated on January 13, 1931.

Death
Clayton died on June 6, 1966 at Guardian Convalescent Hospital in Oxnard, California, aged 83. She was buried at Ivy Lawn Memorial Park in Ventura, California.

For her contributions to the motion picture industry, Clayton has a star on the Hollywood Walk of Fame at 6936 Hollywood Boulevard.

Selected filmography

1909 to 1914
Justified (1909) (*short)
Gratitude (1909) (*short)
The Brothers (1909) (*short)
The Twelfth Juror (1909) (*short)
The Tout's Remembrance (1910)(*short)
For the Love of a Girl (1912) (*short)
A Romance of the Coast (1912) (*short)
The Doctor's Debt (1912)
The Last Rose of Summer (1912) (*short)
Just Maine Folk (1912)
An Irish Girl's Love (*short)
The Wonderful One-Horse Shay (1912)
The Price Demanded (1913)
When the Earth Trembled (1913) Extant; restored 2015 by EyeMuseum, Netherlands
The Lion and the Mouse (1914)
The House Next Door (1914)
The Daughters of Men (1914)
The Fortune Hunter (1914)

1915
The Attorney for the Defense (*short)
The Furnace Man (*short)
His Soul Mate (*short)
It All Depends (*short)
The Millinery Man (*short)
A Woman Went Forth (*short)
Margie Puts One Over (*short)
Here Comes the Bride (*short)
The Blessed Miracle (*short)
Monkey Business (*short)
The Unmarried Husband (*short)
Capturing the Cook (*short)
Just Look at Jake (*short)
The College Widow (*5–6 reels) – Lost
In the Dark (*short)
The Sporting Duchess (*short)
The Darkness Before Dawn (*short)
Money! Money! Money! (*short)When the Light Came In (*short)The Earl's Adventure (*short)A Day of Havoc (*short)The Deception (*short)It Was to Be (*short)The Mirror (*short)In Spite of Him (*short)The Orgy (*short)The Great Divide (*5 reels) Her last film produced by Lubin Manufacturing Company

1916Ophelia (*short, she appears in one more short in 1926)Dollars and the Woman His Brother's Wife A Woman's WayHusband and Wife The Hidden ScarBeyond the WallThe New SouthDollars and the Woman1917
 The Woman Beneath 
 The Bondage of Fear The Web of DesireMan's Woman 
 Yankee Pluck The Stolen Paradise (incomplete; Library of Congress)
 Souls Adrift 
 The Dormant Power (*Extant; Filmmuseum Nederlands (EYE) ..)
 Easy Money1918Stolen Hours (*extant: LoC, Natl. Archives of Canada)The Whims of SocietyThe Witch Woman (*incomplete; LoC)Journey's EndThe Man HuntThe Girl Who Came BackA Soul Without WindowsWomen's WeaponsThe Mystery Girl1919Maggie PepperPettigrew's GirlThe Woman Next DoorMen, Women, and MoneyA Sporting ChanceMore Deadly Than the Male1920The Thirteenth CommandmentYoung Mrs. WinthropA Lady in LoveThe Ladder of LiesCrooked Streets (Survives; Library of Congress)A City SparrowThe Sins of Rosanne (Survives; Library of Congress)

1921The Price of Possession Sham Wealth Beyond (Survives; Library of Congress)Exit the Vamp1922Her Own Money The Cradle (*extant; LoC) For the DefenseIf I Were Queen1923
 Can a Woman Love Twice? 
 The Remittance Woman1925
 The Mansion of Aching HeartsWings of Youth – LostLightnin' – Survives

1926The Bar-C Mystery – LostThe Merry Widower (*short, last short of her career) – SurvivesSunny Side Up – SurvivesRisky Business – Survives
 His New York Wife1927The Princess from Hoboken (1927) Lost
 The Princess on Broadway (1927) Lost

1928 to 1947Mother Machree (1928)- IncompleteHit the Deck (1930) sound debutThe Crooked Circle (1932)The All American (1932)Secrets (1933)The Whispering Shadow (1933)Let's Fall in Love (1933)Easy to Take (1936)Rich Relations (1937)Souls at Sea (1937)The Big Broadcast of 1938 (1938)You and Me (1938)The Sap Takes a Wrap (1939)New York Town (1941)Beyond the Blue Horizon (1942)Dixie (1943)Henry Aldrich's Little Secret (1944)The Blue Dahlia (1946)The Perils of Pauline (1947)

 See also 

ReferencesThe New York Times, "Decree To Ethel Clayton", February 27, 1932, Page 20.The New York Times, "Film Couple Re-Divorced", July 20, 1932, Page 20.The New York Times'', "Ethel Clayton", June 12, 1966, Page 86.

External links

 
 Ethel Clayton at Virtual History
 Ethel Clayton: Broadway Photographs (Univ. of South Carolina)(Wayback)
 portrait gallery(Univ. of Washington, Sayre collection)

1882 births
1966 deaths
20th-century American actresses
Actresses from Illinois
American film actresses
American silent film actresses
American stage actresses
People from Champaign, Illinois
Western (genre) film actresses
Burials at Ivy Lawn Cemetery